The 2022 F4 Spanish Championship was the seventh season of the Spanish F4 Championship. It was a multi-event motor racing championship for open wheel, formula racing cars regulated according to FIA Formula 4 regulations, based in Spain. It was the first season to use the Tatuus F4-T-421 car. It was also the first full season in which the series is partnered with the Richard Mille Young Talent Academy.
The Championship was won by Bulgarian driver Nikola Tsolov with a round to spare, at Navarra.

Entry list 
Campos Racing and MP Motorsport split their teams in order to follow the four-car limit per entrant.

 Andrea Frassineti was scheduled to compete for Cars Racing, but withdrew prior to the start of the season.
 Lola Lovinfosse was originally scheduled to compete for GRS Team, but switched to Teo Martín Motorsport prior to the start of the season.

Race calendar and results
The calendar was announced on 3 December 2021. The five rounds in Spain were organized by the RFEDA. The season opener at Portimão was held in support of the Deutsche Tourenwagen Masters and the second abroad event took place at Circuit de Spa-Francorchamps.

Championship standings 
Points are awarded to the top ten classified finishers in 25-minute races and for the top eight classified finishers in 18-minute races.

Drivers' championship

Secondary Classes' standings

Teams' standings 
Two best finishers score points for their team. Bonus points are not counted.

Notes

References

External links 

 

Spanish
Spanish F4 Championship seasons
F4
Spanish F4